Ikkjutt Jammu (also stylised as IkkJutt Jammu) is a party based in the Jammu region of Jammu and Kashmir, India. It advocates for the creation of a separate Jammu state out of the Dogri speaking districts of Jammu Division and for the reorganisation of Kashmir Division into two union territories, one being Panun Kashmir for Kashmiri Hindus who have been displaced from the region. It was founded in November 2020 and is currently led by Ankur Sharma.

History
IkkJutt Jammu was originally founded as a social organisation based in Jammu. It officially became a political party on 14 November 2020. IkkJutt Jammu campaigned against the Roshni Act, which was declared unconstitutional by the Jammu and Kashmir High Court in 2020.

Platform
In addition to advocating statehood for the Jammu Division, the party seeks a return of Kashmiri Hindu IDPs to the region, the complete administrative integration of  Jammu and Kashmir with the rest of India and to promote and restore Dogra heritage and pride in the region. It wants to stop what it describes as "Muslim separatism" and the "Jihadi war" in the region. The party believes that "Pan-Islamic forces" are carrying out war against the Indian nation and believes that these forces have "cleansed Kashmir of Hindus" and turned the region into a "Muslim monolith" through a process of "demographic invasion".

The party demands Kashmir Division be split into two separate Union Territories, one for the almost entirely displaced Kashmiri Hindu community (Panun Kashmir). Ikkjutt Jammu demands that the Exodus of Kashmiri Hindus be recognised as a genocide and also demands protection of Jammu's Hindu demography.

See also 
 Politics of Jammu and Kashmir
 Bharatiya Janata Party
 Jammu and Kashmir Workers Party
 Jammu and Kashmir Apni Party

References

External links
IkkJutt Jammu on Facebook
IkkJutt Jammu on Twitter

Political parties in India
State political parties in Jammu and Kashmir
2020 establishments in Jammu and Kashmir
Political parties established in 2020